In linear algebra, a defective matrix is a square matrix that does not have a complete basis of eigenvectors, and is therefore not diagonalizable.  In particular, an n × n matrix is defective if and only if it does not have n linearly independent eigenvectors.  A complete basis is formed by augmenting the eigenvectors with generalized eigenvectors, which are necessary for solving defective systems of ordinary differential equations and other problems.

An n × n defective matrix always has fewer than n distinct eigenvalues, since distinct eigenvalues always have linearly independent eigenvectors.  In particular, a defective matrix has one or more eigenvalues λ with algebraic multiplicity m > 1 (that is, they are multiple roots of the characteristic polynomial), but fewer than m linearly independent eigenvectors associated with λ. If the algebraic multiplicity of λ exceeds its geometric multiplicity (that is, the number of linearly independent eigenvectors associated with λ), then λ is said to be a defective eigenvalue.  However, every eigenvalue with algebraic multiplicity m always has m linearly independent generalized eigenvectors.

A Hermitian matrix (or the special case of a real symmetric matrix) or a unitary matrix is never defective; more generally, a normal matrix (which includes Hermitian and unitary as special cases) is never defective.

Jordan block

Any nontrivial Jordan block of size  or larger (that is, not completely diagonal) is defective.  (A diagonal matrix is a special case of the Jordan normal form with all trivial Jordan blocks of size  and is not defective.)  For example, the  Jordan block

Any defective matrix has a nontrivial Jordan normal form, which is as close as one can come to diagonalization of such a matrix.

Example

A simple example of a defective matrix is

which has a double eigenvalue of 3 but only one distinct eigenvector

(and constant multiples thereof).

See also

Notes

References

 
 

Linear algebra
Matrices